Peavey is an unincorporated community in Twin Falls County, Idaho, United States, roughly  west-northwest of Filer. Peavey had a post office from 1907–1909. Pevey is located along U.S. Route 30.

Peavey is part of the Twin Falls, Idaho Metropolitan Statistical Area.

See also

References

Unincorporated communities in Idaho
Unincorporated communities in Twin Falls County, Idaho